Claudine André, (born 6 November 1946 in La Hestre), is a Belgian conservationist.  She founded Lola ya bonobo in 1994, which is a bonobo sanctuary, just south of Kinshasa, at Mont Ngafula, in the Lukaya Valley, Democratic Republic of Congo.

The aim of the sanctuary is to collect young bonobos, most having been orphaned due to the actions of poachers, and eventually reintroduce them into a forest reserve. During the same year, Claudine André started the Friends of Animals in the Congo, of which she is still president.

Earlier life
André was born in Hainaut Province, Belgium, and arrived in Congo as a child, with her father, who was a veterinary surgeon, and has lived there ever since. She ran an art boutique, sourcing and selling rare art works. She married Victor and has five children. When war disrupted daily life in Kinshasa, the capital city of the Democratic Republic of Congo, in the 1990s, Claudine worked as a volunteer in Kinshasa Zoo, because the animals had been neglected and were starving. Elsewhere in the country, people were finding traditional food production difficult, because of the war, and turned instead to bushmeat to feed themselves and their families. This in turn led to orphaned bonobos turning up for sale on the streets of Kinshasa - and it was from this situation that Claudine started Lola ya bonobo.

Bibliography 
 Claudine André, Une tendresse sauvage, Calmann-Lévy, Paris, 2006. 
 Claudine André, Lola ya Bonobo : Le paradis des Bonobos - République Démocratique du Congo, Éditions Oka, Paris, 2010.

See also
 Lola ya Bonobo
 List of animal rights activists

References

External links
Lola ya Bonobo
Une Tendresse Sauvage

1946 births
Living people
People from Manage, Belgium
Walloon people
Belgian conservationists
Belgian women environmentalists
Keepers of animal sanctuaries
Belgian expatriates in the Democratic Republic of the Congo